Osasco is a train station on ViaMobilidade Lines 8-Diamond and 9-Emerald, located in the city of Osasco.

History
The station was built by Antonio Agù and opened on 20 August 1895 by Estrada de Ferro Sorocabana. Due to the prestige and influence of the Italian immigrant, the station was named after its city, Osasco.

In the 1940s, Cobrasma factory was opened, next to the line. Later, it would provide trains of Fepasa West Line (current CPTM Line 8-Diamond), which circulate until nowadays. In 1960, a new building was built in the station, which became saturated in a short period of time. Meanwhile, the then-neighbourhood of Osasco fought and got its emancipation.

In 1971, Fepasa dissolved Estrada de Ferro Sorocabana and, at the end of that decade, rebuilt most of the West Line stations. Osasco received a new station, opened on 25 January 1979. In the same year, Osasco was chosen as a start point for Fepasa South Line (current CPTM Line 9-Emerald).

In 1996, West and South Lines were transferred to CPTM.

References

Companhia Paulista de Trens Metropolitanos stations
Railway stations opened in 1895